Diogo Coutinho (born 3 September 1977) is a former Portuguese rugby union footballer. He played as a flanker for Direito, a Lisbon team.

He had 35 caps for Portugal, from 2000 to 2007, scoring 4 tries, 20 points in aggregate. Coutinho played in three games at the 2007 Rugby World Cup, and was chosen as the Man of the Match in the 10–14 loss to Romania.

His last cap was at 1 December 2007, in an 8–23 loss to Romania.

References

External links
Diogo Coutinho International Statistics

1977 births
Living people
Portuguese rugby union players
Rugby union flankers
Rugby union players from Lisbon
Portugal international rugby union players